Events from the year 1814 in Canada.

Incumbents
Monarch: George III

Federal government
Parliament of Lower Canada: 7th (until March 22)
Parliament of Upper Canada: 6th

Governors
Governor of the Canadas: Robert Milnes
Governor of New Brunswick: George Prévost
Governor of Nova Scotia: John Coape Sherbrooke
Commodore-Governor of Newfoundland: Richard Goodwin Keats
Governor of Prince Edward Island: Charles Douglass Smith

Events
 March 3 – The Governor refuses to suspend Chief Justices Sewell and Monk, on suggestion of one branch of the Legislature. James Stuart moves, affirming the Assembly's right to inform the Governor of irregularities, without concurrence of the Council; and that the Governor has violated the Constitution.
 March 7 – The Assembly votes confidence in the Governor, apart from his advisors.
 March 8 – The council sustain their Clerk's refusal to show their minutes to a Committee of the Assembly.
 March 9 – The Assembly vote 2,000 pounds, for impeachment of Chief Justices Sewell and Monk. The Council will not pass the item.
 March 17 – The Assembly resolve that the Council's disallowance of a money bill is contrary to English and Canadian usage.
 May 6 – The British, under Henry Drummond, burn Fort Oswego, on Lake Ontario.
 May 25 – Louis-Joseph Papineau is unanimously elected speaker.
 July 5 – Battle of Chippewa.
 July 25 – The United States lose about 1,000 of 3,000 at the Battle of Lundy's Lane.
 August – 4,000 of Wellington's veterans have reached Canada.
 August 1 to November 5 – The Siege of Fort Erie.
 August 11 – Battle of Lake Champlain.
 August 14 – At Fort Erie, the British lose many lives, by the explosion of a magazine.
 August – General Ross takes Washington, D.C.
 August 25 – The seaboard of the United States is blockaded by ships released from European service.
 August – Envoys consider terms of peace, at Ghent.
 September 12 – An expedition of 11,000 under Governor George Prevost, supplied to winter at Plattsburg, N.Y., seeing its fleet dispersed and the enemy gathering, retreats, abandoning stores. In 1813, Wellington desired that Prevost should not abandon his policy of defence for petty advantages, to be gained by invasion, which he could not possibly maintain.
 October – Martin Chittenden, Governor of Vermont, regards the war "as unnecessary, unwise and hopeless, in all its offensive operations."
 December 22 – Treaty of Commerce, between the U.S. and Great Britain, signed at Ghent.
 December 24 – Treaty of Ghent ends the War of 1812.
 December 27 – Then prince regent George IV ratifies both treaties. One relates to boundaries and the slave trade.
 David Thompson delivers his map of western North America to partners of North West Company.
 Canadian Army bills, 1,500,000 pounds.
 Chief Justice Sewell, while in England, to defend himself, advises uniting the Canadas with one Parliament.
 The Assembly re-proposes representation in London. The Council objects. The Home Government declares that the Governor is the constitutional medium of communication between the Colony and the Imperial Government.

Births
February 10 – David Anderson, Church of England priest and bishop of Rupert's Land (d.1885)
May 3 
John Hamilton Gray, Premier of New Brunswick (d.1889)
Adams George Archibald, politician (d.1892) 
May 20 – William Steeves, politician (d. 1873) 
July 21 – Jacques Philippe Lantier, businessman, author and politician (d.1882)
September 6 – George-Étienne Cartier, politician and statesman (d.1873)

Full date unknown
Thomas-Louis Connolly, Archbishop of Halifax (d.1876)
 William Kennedy April 1814

Deaths
 September 4 – Joseph Willcocks, diarist, office holder, printer, publisher, journalist, politician, and army officer (b.1773)

References 

 
14
1814 in North America